Jamie Zerafa (born 2 March 1998) is a Maltese footballer who plays as a midfielder for St. Lucia F.C. in the Maltese Premier League, on loan from Balzan.

Club career
Zerafa played in the Maltese Premier League with Balzan F.C. between 2015 and 2018. With Balzans, Zerafa was twice Premier League runner-up, in 2016–17 and 2017–18, 2015–16 Maltese FA Trophy finalist, and 2015 winner of Summer Cup.

In May 2018, Zerafa along his Balzan teammate Antonio Mitrev, went on trials to Serbian club FK Inđija. Zerafa passed the trials and signed with Inđija. Zerafa debuted with Inđija in the 2018–19 Serbian First League on September 9, 2018, in a home victory by 4–0 against TSC Bačka Topola. At the end of the season Inđija finished second and achieved promotion to the Serbian SuperLiga, however, in a tough competition to earn playing time, Zerafa managed to make 4 appearances, all as a substitute. At the end of the season he returned to Malta and moved on loan to Maltese newly promoted top-league side St. Lucia F.C.

International career
Since 2016, Zerafa has been a member of Maltese under-19 national team.

Honours
Balzan
Maltese Summer Cup: 2015

References

1998 births
Living people
Maltese footballers
Maltese expatriate footballers
Association football midfielders
Balzan F.C. players
FK Inđija players
St. Lucia F.C. players
Maltese Premier League players
Serbian First League players
Expatriate footballers in Serbia
Maltese expatriate sportspeople in Serbia